Hartmut Konschal (born 2 April 1953) is a German football coach and a former player. As a player, he spent nine seasons in the Bundesliga with Eintracht Braunschweig and SV Werder Bremen.

References

External links
 

Living people
1953 births
People from Salzgitter
Association football defenders
Association football forwards
Footballers from Lower Saxony
German footballers
Eintracht Braunschweig players
SV Werder Bremen players
Bundesliga players
2. Bundesliga players
German football managers
Freiburger FC players
20th-century German people